Mohamed Umair (born 3 July 1988) is a Maldivian international footballer. In his career Umair has played as a defender, midfielder, and forward.

International career
Umair made his debut for Maldives on 8 October 2007, in a 2010 FIFA World Cup qualification match against Yemem and later he was substituted for Mukhthar Naseer in the 60th minute at the Ali Muhsin Al-Muriasi Stadium.

He has represented his country at the 2011 SAFF Championship and the 2013 SAFF Championship. In the latter tournament he scored a goal from a free kick against Bhutan to tie the score up at 2–2. Maldives went on to win the game 8–2.

International goals
Scores and results list Maldives' goal tally first.

Achievements
In 2013 Umair won the best player award in the Maldives for his performance with VB Sports Club in the past season. He also won the golden boot award with 26 goals in the season.

References

External links

 maldivesoccer.com profile
 Goal.com profile
 
 

1988 births
Living people
Maldivian footballers
Maldives international footballers
New Radiant S.C. players
Association football midfielders
Association football utility players
Footballers at the 2006 Asian Games
Footballers at the 2010 Asian Games
Asian Games competitors for the Maldives
South Asian Games bronze medalists for Maldives
South Asian Games medalists in football